The Freedom Monument, located in the center of the Plaza de Armas in Trujillo, Peru, is the work of sculptor Edmund Moeller. It consists of three sections: the first is on a circular platform with pedestals, resting on a granite base, and supporting sculptures representing the art, science, trade and health. The second section consists of three statues: a bent man, symbolizing oppression or slavery; a person with arms reaching backwards, symbolizing the struggle for freedom; and a man with arms raised and hands making fists, symbolizing liberation. The section contains three plaques. The first recalls the proclamation of the independence of Trujillo by José Bernardo de Torre Tagle, on December 29, 1820. The second plaque commemorates the Battle of Junín, and the third plaque commemorates the Battle of Ayacucho.

History
Trujillo became independent on December 29, 1820, when Don Jose Bernardo Marques de la Torre Tagle proclaimed the independence of the Municipality of Trujillo, at that time belonging to the Viceroyalty of Peru. This event prompted the authorities to glorify the ancestors in marble. This idea, already rooted in the select group, was picked up by the regional deputy Enrique Marquina, who in the Northern Congress of 1899, managed to issue a special law. Then a committee was composed of the prefect, the rector of the Universidad Nacional de Trujillo, President of the Superior Court of Justice of La Libertad, the mayor of the province of Trujillo, and other authorities. This commission was responsible for controlling and directing the construction of the Freedom Monument to be located in the center of the Plaza de Armas of Trujillo.
In 1921, he drafted the contest to build the monument, calling for national and foreign artists. After the call, the commission, chaired by the Prefect Derteano Molina, received 104 models, mostly from Europe.

The model chosen was the work of the German artist Edmund Moeller, for better symbolize the significance of the historical event of the libertarian group. The jury awarded the sculptor the prize of 1000 pounds, which was recorded, and then make the necessary arrangements to come to Moeller and undertakes the construction of the monument.
Moeller artist's work is considered very bold in conception. The sculptor described the model after it was placed the first stone on May 10, 1925.
The agreement with Moeller to cover the cost of the project was 250 thousand Soles de Oro, it was built in (Germany). After four years, one month and 25 days, the monument was inaugurated on July 4, 1929, acting as sponsors Augusto B. Leguia, President, and his daughter Carmen Rosa Leguia Swayne.

See also
Trujillo city
Edmund Moeller
Historic Centre of Trujillo
Plaza de Armas of Trujillo

External links

Location in Main Square of Trujillo city
Website about Trujillo, Reviews, Events, Business Directory

Multimedia
 
 
 
 Gallery pictures of Trujillo by Panoramio, Includes Geographical information by various authors
Colonial Trujillo photos

Monuments and memorials in Peru
Buildings and structures in Trujillo, Peru
Tourist attractions in Trujillo, Peru
Cultural heritage of Peru